The Genius (The Genius Game) was a South Korean reality game show. The first season premiered on April 26, 2013 on tvN, with four seasons in total airing between 2013 and 2015.

The show pits thirteen contestants against each other as they compete in various challenges, known as matches, which test their strategic thinking and social skills. Contestants are eliminated in head-to-head matches until only one remains and is awarded the title of "the Genius" and a cash prize.

Format
Thirteen contestants, often celebrities, are selected to play in each season. Each episode (besides the season finale) features a Main Match and a Death Match.

In the Main Match, all players compete to win a "token of life", which guarantees them safety from elimination that episode. What determines the winners and losers of each Main Match depends from match to match, but typically, if a single player wins the Main Match, they earn one token of life for themselves and another to give away to a player of their choice. Some Main Matches allow for more than one winner, in which case each of the winners receives one token of life. The loser of the Main Match (as determined by that match's rules) is the "elimination candidate" and is automatically sent to the Death Match. The elimination candidate selects a player without a token of life to compete against in the Death Match. If multiple players lost the Main Match, the winner(s) of the Main Match select the elimination candidate from among the losers.

The Death Match is a one-on-one challenge, the loser of which is eliminated from the season. Once two players remain, they compete in the best-of-three Final Match, and the first player to win two challenges is declared the winner of the season.

Each season also features "garnets", which function as the show's in-game currency, and can be used to purchase advantages during certain matches or given to other players to persuade them to make certain decisions. Every player begins the season with one garnet each, and can earn more garnets by winning Main Matches. In seasons one and two, the winner of a Death Match earned the losing player's garnets; in seasons three and four, the loser's garnets were removed from the game instead. At the end of the season, the winner's garnets are converted into cash, which each garnet worth ₩1,000,000.

Series overview

Accusations of plagiarism
The Genius has been accused of plagiarizing popular Japanese manga series through its choice of matches. For example, the first Main Match of season one, "1.2.3 Game" has been compared to "Restricted Rock, Paper, Scissors" from Kaiji, and season one's fourth Main Match "Zombie Game" to "Angels and Demons" from Liar Game: Season 2 (aka, "Infection Game" in original manga). and also people pointed out that concept, format of series are similar to Japanese live-action version of Liar Game.

Jung Jong-yeon, the producer of The Genius, claimed that all games in the series are they designed themselves, and they never bought any other media's copyrights. and initially denied receiving any inspiration from these media, instead saying he was "inspired by Big Brother and Survivor, not a Liar Game." during interview in 2013. But in 2014, He later admitted to using Liar Game as a reference by saying "(it was) reference, but not copied." and still denied plagiarizing any matches from Liar Game. The fans of the Liar Game were not happy with this response and are currently still demanding an apology.

tvN later broadcast a korean live-action remake of Liar Game in 2014. But it was mentioned that only drama production company 'Apollo Pictures' hold the Liar Game's copyright, not The Genius team. Jung Jong-yeon says The Genius has nothing to do with this remake.

International adaptations
A Dutch version of The Genius premiered on NTR on October 3, 2022. CJ E&M has also sold the copyright for The Genius to production companies in France and the United Kingdom.

Awards and nominations

References

External links

 
South Korean game shows
Television shows involved in plagiarism controversies